There Goes the Neighborhood may refer to:

Albums and songs
There Goes the Neighborhood (album), by American rock guitarist/vocalist Joe Walsh in 1981
Whoops! There Goes the Neighbourhood, 1989 album by British New Wave band The Blow Monkeys
"There Goes the Neighborhood" (Body Count song), by American heavy metal band in 1992
"There Goes the Neighborhood" (Sheryl Crow song), by American rocker in 1998
There Goes the Neighborhood (EP), by American rapper Chris Webby in 2011
there goes the neighborhood, 2020 mixtape by American rap/R&B collective grouptherapy with Coy Stewart

Books
There Goes the Neighbourhood: An Irreverent History of Canada, 1992 collection of satirical cartoons by Adrian Raeside
There Goes the Neighborhood (book), 2006 investigative study by American sociologists William Julius Wilson and Richard Taub

Visual and audio media
There Goes the Neighborhood (film), 1992 American comedy a/k/a Paydirt
Backyard Wrestling 2: There Goes the Neighborhood, 2004 American video game
There Goes the Neighborhood (TV series), 2009 American reality TV
"There Goes the Neighborhood" (The Vampire Diaries), April 1, 2010 episode of American TV series
There Goes the Neighborhood (podcast), 2010s American podcast